Wally Masur (born 13 May 1963) is a tennis coach, television commentator, and former professional tennis player from Sydney, Australia. He reached the semifinals of the 1987 Australian Open and the 1993 US Open, achieving a career-high singles ranking of world No. 15 in October 1993.

Tennis career

Juniors
Masur began playing tennis at the age of eight.
In 1980, he reached the final of the Australian Open boys' singles tournament and won the boys' doubles title.

Pro tour
Masur turned professional in 1982. He was an Australian Institute of Sport scholarship holder.

In 1983, Masur won his first top-level singles title at Hong Kong, and his first tour doubles title at Taipei. He also reached quarterfinals of that year's Australian Open, before being knocked out by John McEnroe.

In 1987, Masur won his second career singles title at Adelaide and reached the Australian Open semifinals, where he lost to eventual champion Stefan Edberg.

Masur won his third singles title in 1988 at Newport, Rhode Island.

In 1990, Masur helped Australia reach the final of the Davis Cup, compiling a 6–0 record in singles rubbers in the first round, quarterfinals and semifinals. However he was left out of the team that played the United States in the final by captain Neale Fraser. The decision to leave Masur out of the final was fairly controversial at the time given the very significant role that he had played in getting Australia there, but was principally because the final was to be played on clay courts, which was not Masur's best surface. The US team beat Australia 3–2 in the final.

1993 was the best year of Masur's career. He reached the semifinals of that year's US Open, where he lost to Cédric Pioline. He also reached his career-high rankings in both singles (world No. 15) and doubles (No. 8) that year. He captured doubles titles in Milan and Stuttgart that year, which proved to be the final top-level titles of his career.

Masur retired from the professional tour in 1995, having won three singles titles and 16 doubles titles.

Post playing
In January 2015, Masur was appointed captain of Australia's Davis Cup team, succeeding Pat Rafter. He was succeeded by Lleyton Hewitt in 2016.

ATP career finals

Singles: 11 (3 titles, 8 runner-ups)

Doubles: 24 (16 titles, 8 runner-ups)

Performance timelines

Singles

Doubles

Junior Grand Slam finals

Singles: 1 (1 runner-up)

Doubles: 1 (1 title)

References

External links
 
 
 
 

1963 births
Living people
Sportspeople from Southampton
Australian male tennis players
Australian Open (tennis) junior champions
Australian tennis coaches
English emigrants to Australia
Olympic tennis players of Australia
Australian tennis commentators
Tennis players from Sydney
Tennis players at the 1988 Summer Olympics
Tennis players at the 1992 Summer Olympics
Hopman Cup competitors
Australian Institute of Sport tennis players
Sportspeople from Canberra
Grand Slam (tennis) champions in boys' doubles